The 2012 Ladies Tour of Qatar was the third edition of the Ladies Tour of Qatar cycling stage race. It was rated by the UCI as category 2.1, and was held between 3 and 5 February 2012, in Qatar.

Stages

Stage 1
1 February 2012 – Camelodrome to Al Khawr, 

Extremely windy conditions made stage 1 of the Ladies’ Tour of Qatar very eventful. After taking off early making the best of the tailwind, 7 riders battled it out for victory  in Al Khor. In the last kilometres title holder Ellen van Dijk tried her luck taking with her Loes Gunnewijk and Kirsten Wild. But the front group bunched together again for the final sprint. Wild eventually flew to victory beating Hosking and Van Dijk to the line and claiming the first stage of the 2012 edition.

Stage 2
2 February 2012 – Al Zubarah to Madinat ash Shamal, 

Straight from the start, just after noon, the pack broke up into several groups as soon as the first kilometres. Like on the previous day, a group of 11 and then 9 riders managed to power away. At km 28, the group including Van Dijk, white jersey Hosking, Worrack, Golden jersey Wild, Duster, Guderzo, Arndt, Gunnewijk and Bruins could enjoy a 28" lead over a first slim bunch of chasers. Eventually, as the riders entered the final circuit around Madinat Al Shamal, the leaders lost ground with the wind blowing sideways. At the second intermediate sprint (first passage on the line, km 78), won by Arndt ahead of Wild and Van Dijk, the gap had dropped down to 20". The leaders were finally caught at km 85 and over 40 riders were bunched together again. Despite several attempts, the pack remained together until the second passage on the line. At km 89, Worrack, Arndt, Wild and Visser managed to take off. Two kilometres later, the first two insisted and the gaps grew: 20" over Wild and Visser and 50" over the peloton. With just four kilometres left, Worrack and Arndt could enjoy a 1’15 advantage over the first two chasers and 1’35 over the pack. Victory finally went to Trixi Worrack outsprinting her day's rival and claiming her first success in Qatar while Judith Arndt captured the overall leader's Golden jersey.

Stage 3
3 February 2012 – Doha to Doha, 

The third and final stage of the Ladies’ Tour of Qatar competed in windy conditions, ended in a bunched sprint. The peloton remained packed all the way to the finish at a very fast pace due to the tailwind all the way to the finish. Decision was to be made after a bunched sprint. Like on day 1, Kirsten Wild powered to victory. The Dutch rider beat her compatriots Ellen van Dijk and Adrie Visser to the line. Germany's Judith Arndt managed to keep control of her leader's Golden jersey and wins this 2012 edition of the event.

Final classifications

General classification

Points Classification

Youth Classification

Team Classification

References

External links

See also
2012 in women's road cycling

Tour of Qatar
Tour of Qatar
Ladies Tour of Qatar